Harald Østberg Amundsen (born 18 September 1998) is a Norwegian cross-country skier.

At the 2017 Junior World Championships he won a relay gold medal and a skiathlon bronze medal, following up with gold medals in both events at the 2018 Junior World Championships. He made his World Cup debut in December 2018 at Beitostølen, where he also collected his first World Cup point with a 30th place in the 30 kilometres race. At the 2020 Under-23 World Championships in Oberwiesenthal, Amundsen won three individual medals; one of them the gold medal at the 30 km freestyle event.

He represents the sports club Asker SK. He is the twin brother of Hedda Østberg Amundsen.

Cross-country skiing results
All results are sourced from the International Ski Federation (FIS).

World Championships
 2 medals – (1 silver, 1 bronze)

World Cup

Season standings

Individual podiums
 1 victory – (1 )
 3 podiums – (3 )

Team podiums
 3 podiums – (2 , 1 )

References

External links

1998 births
Living people
People from Asker
Norwegian male cross-country skiers
Twin sportspeople
Norwegian twins
Sportspeople from Viken (county)
FIS Nordic World Ski Championships medalists in cross-country skiing